Ninetology is a Malaysian smart phone manufacturer. It was founded in April 2012 by Sean Ng, Marco Beh and Shian and ceased operation in November 2014. It has been taken over by Avaxx Corporation (Malaysian Microsoft distributor) in January 2015.

Business

Accomplishment

As of March 2014, Ninetology has sold 1 million devices and have also expanded to Indonesia in September 2013. It has recorded a MYR 180 million in revenue and a 12% Malaysian market share in 2013. Ninetology partners with AirAsia in 2014 for the latter to sport Ninetology and Qualcomm livery on their aircraft to mark Ninetology expansion plan to other ASEAN countries which include Philippines, Thailand, Cambodia, Myanmar and Vietnam.

Decline
According to International Data Corporation (IDC), 2014 was not a good year for Ninetology due to stiff competition of cheaper phones from China. In September 2014, it is reported that the founders of Ninetology have resigned from their post.

Models

 Ninetology Black Pearl II
 Ninetology Insight
 Ninetology Outlook Pure (tablet)
 Ninetology Pearl Mini
 Ninetology Stealth II
 Ninetology U9X1
 Ninetology U9Z1
 Ninetology U9Z1+
 Ninetology Vox

External links
 Ninetology

References

2012 establishments in Malaysia
2014 disestablishments in Malaysia
Mobile phone manufacturers
Electronics companies of Malaysia
Companies based in Shah Alam
Malaysian brands